Erik Hansen may refer to:

Erik Hansen (architect) (1927–2016), Danish architect
Erik Hansen (linguist) (1931–2017), Danish linguist
Erik Hansen (canoeist) (1939–2014), Danish flatwater canoer
Erik Hansen (sailor) (born 1945), Danish sailor and Olympic champion
Erik Fosnes Hansen (born 1965), Norwegian writer
Erik Hansen (football manager), managed Denmark national team, 1967–69
Erik Haaest (born Erik Hansen, 1935–2012), Danish journalist and writer
Erik Hansen (footballer)

See also
Eric Hansen (disambiguation)
Erik Hanson (disambiguation)
Erik Kofoed-Hansen (1897–1965), Danish fencer
Erik Ninn-Hansen (1922–2014), Danish politician